Grovewood, also known as Weston House, is a historic home near Congaree, Richland County, South Carolina. The original one-story dwelling was built about 1765, and moved to this site and enlarged to two-stories about 1835. It is a frame dwelling, with a stuccoed brick foundation, weatherboard siding, and a low hipped roof. Also on the property is a contributing frame kitchen.

It was added to the National Register of Historic Places in 1986.

References

Houses on the National Register of Historic Places in South Carolina
Greek Revival houses in South Carolina
Houses completed in 1835
Houses in Richland County, South Carolina
National Register of Historic Places in Richland County, South Carolina